Michael Ryderstedt (born 12 November 1984) is a former professional tennis player from Sweden.

Ryderstedt was born in Stockholm.  In August 2001, at the Fischer Junior Open he captured the doubles title with Dudi Sela of Israel.

His best accomplishment on the ATP tour until 2011 is his semifinal at the 2004 If Stockholm Open, where he was defeated by that year's eventual winner Thomas Johansson.

Ryderstedt's highest singles ranking was World No. 130 (July 2005) and his highest doubles ranking was World No. 154 (June 2009). In October 2012, Ryderstedt announced his retirement from tennis.

ATP career finals

Doubles: 1 (0–1)

Challenger Singles titles

Challenger Doubles titles

Runners-up (6)

References

External links
 

Swedish male tennis players
Tennis players from Stockholm
1984 births
Living people